Gunahon Ka Faisla is a 1988 Indian Bollywood action film directed by Shibu Mitra and produced by Pahlaj Nihalani. It stars Shatrughan Sinha, Chunky Pandey and Dimple Kapadia in pivotal roles.

Cast
 Shatrughan Sinha as Birju
 Chunky Pandey as Sheru
 Dimple Kapadia as Shanno / Durga (Dual Role)
 Pran as Forest Officer
 Prem Chopra as Chaudhary
 Danny Denzongpa as Chaudhary
 Gulshan Grover as Chaudhary
 Ranjeet as Chaudhary
 Shakti Kapoor
 Aruna Irani
 Anjana Mumtaz
 Sudhir as Shiva

Soundtrack

References

External links

1980s Hindi-language films
1988 films
Films scored by Bappi Lahiri
Films directed by Shibu Mitra
Indian action films